The 1898 Indiana Hoosiers football team was an American football team that represented Indiana University Bloomington during the 1898 college football season. In their first season under head coach James H. Horne, the Hoosiers compiled a 4–1–2 record and outscored their opponents by a combined total of 90 to 30.

Schedule

References

Indiana
Indiana Hoosiers football seasons
Indiana Hoosiers football